Țiriac Air (SC Ion Țiriac Air SRL) is a Romanian corporate charter airline with its head office at Henri Coandă International Airport near Bucharest, operating from Henri Coandă International Airport.

History
Țiriac Air was founded in 1997, as part of Țiriac Group. The airline operates a helicopter and business jets, and is the sole Romanian operator to own a private VIP Terminal and hangar capability. Tiriac Air operates as a maintenance base for Agusta helicopters under EASA Part 145 certification.

Fleet
The Țiriac Air fleet consists of the following aircraft:

 1 Bombardier Global 5000
 1 Gulfstream G200
 2 Embraer Phenom 300+Embraer Phenom 300E
 1 AgustaWestland AW139

References

External links

Official website

Airlines of Romania
Airlines established in 1997
Charter airlines
Companies based in Bucharest
Romanian companies established in 1997